Young Malagasies Determined (or TGV) is a political movement in Madagascar. It is headed by the current President, Andry Rajoelina, who organized it prior to the Antananarivo mayoral election in 2007.

The term TGV is also a reference to Andry Rajoelina's nickname, a reference to the French high-speed train TGV and to Rajoelina's fast-mover's personality.

Politically, TGV promotes government transparency, the development of infrastructure, and multigenerational politics. It is the main centre-left rival of the centre-right Tiako I Madagasikara, and currently holds a majority in the national assembly.

Electoral history

Presidential elections

National Assembly elections

References

Political parties in Madagascar